Schizothorax lepidothorax is a species of ray-finned fish in the  family Cyprinidae. The species is only known from Fuxian Lake in Yunnan.

References

Schizothorax
Endemic fauna of Yunnan
Freshwater fish of China
Fish described in 1991
Taxonomy articles created by Polbot